The 1904 United States presidential election in Wisconsin was held on November 8, 1904 as part of the 1904 United States presidential election. State voters chose 13 electors to the Electoral College, who voted for president and vice president.

Background and vote
Wisconsin during the Third Party System was a Republican-leaning but competitive state whereby historically anti-Civil War German Catholic counties stood opposed to highly pro-war and firmly Republican Yankee areas. However, following the Populist movement, whose inflationary monetary policies were opposed by almost all urban classes and viewed as dangerously radical by rural German Catholics, Wisconsin’s upper classes, along with the majority of workers who followed them, completely fled from William Jennings Bryan’s agrarian and free silver sympathies.

Wisconsin would henceforth become almost a one-party polity dominated by the Republican Party. The Democratic Party became entirely uncompetitive outside the previously anti-Yankee areas adjoining Lake Michigan in the eastern part of the state. As Democratic strength weakened severely after 1894 – although the state did develop a strong Socialist Party to provide opposition to the GOP – Wisconsin developed the direct Republican primary in 1903 and this ultimately created competition between the “League” under Robert M. La Follette, and the conservative “Regular” faction.

Neither Republican incumbent Theodore Roosevelt nor Democratic nominee Alton B. Parker would campaign in Wisconsin, as the state had been amongst the most Republican in the nation in the presidential elections in both 1896 and 1900. No official polls were taken in the state, but Frederick W. Cotzhausen, a lifelong Milwaukee Democrat, said during October that the state would vote strongly for Roosevelt.

Wisconsin would vote powerfully for Roosevelt, who defeated Parker more than two-to-one, and beat William McKinley’s 1896 performance by almost four percent. Roosevelt was the first Republican to carry Calumet County.

Results

Results by county

See also
 United States presidential elections in Wisconsin

References

Wisconsin
1904 Wisconsin elections
1904